Sir Henry Rich, 1st Baronet (1803 – 5 November 1869) was a Liberal Party politician in the United Kingdom. He was Member of Parliament for Knaresborough in 1837 and for Richmond between 1846 & 1861 when he accepted the Chiltern Hundreds to make room for Sir Roundell Palmer. He was Lord of the Treasury from July 1846 to March 1852.

Educated at Sandhurst and Trinity College, Cambridge (B.A. in 1825). He served in the British Army and was at the taking of Poonah and the Battle of Kirkee for which he was awarded a medal. For some time he was a Groom in Waiting to her Majesty Queen Victoria.

He was the illegitimate son of Admiral Sir Thomas Rich, 5th Baronet of Sonning (1733–1803), and Elizabeth Burt. On 7 September 1852 at the parish church of Acton, Cheshire, he married Julia, daughter of the late Rev. James Tomkinson of Dorfield Hall, Cheshire.

He was created a baronet in 1863.

His remains were interred in the Rich family vault at St Andrew's Church, Sonning, Berkshire on 10 November 1869.

References

Boase, F., Modern English biography, 6 vols, 1892–1921
Morning Post 15 November 1869
Staffordshire Advertiser 11 September 1852

External links 
 

1803 births
1869 deaths
Alumni of Trinity College, Cambridge
Graduates of the Royal Military College, Sandhurst
Baronets in the Baronetage of the United Kingdom
Liberal Party (UK) MPs for English constituencies
UK MPs 1837–1841
UK MPs 1841–1847
UK MPs 1847–1852
UK MPs 1852–1857
UK MPs 1857–1859
UK MPs 1859–1865
Henry